Katherine Hollingsworth is a former American Democrat politician from who served in the Missouri House of Representatives.

Born in Columbia, Missouri, she attended St. Pius X. High School, Jefferson College, and Southeast Missouri State University. She previously worked as a paralegal for a department store company.

References

20th-century American politicians
21st-century American politicians
20th-century American women politicians
21st-century American women politicians
Democratic Party members of the Missouri House of Representatives
Living people
Women state legislators in Missouri
Year of birth missing (living people)